Public policy degrees, public administration degrees and public affairs degrees are graduate master's and PhD level professional degrees or undergraduate bachelor's degree level academic majors, concentrations, and academic minors at research-intensive universities, offered by public policy schools.  These include but are not limited to:

Doctoral Degrees

 PhD in Public Policy
 PhD in Policy Studies
 PhD in Policy Analysis
 PhD in Public Administration
 PhD in Political Economy and Government
 PhD in Social Policy
 Doctor of Public Administration (DPA)
 PhD in Political Science.

Master's Degrees
 Master of Public Affairs (M.P.A.)
 Master of Public Policy (M.P.P.)
 Master of Public Administration (M.P.A. or M.P.Adm.)
 Master of Public Policy and Administration (M.P.P.A.)
 Master of Public Service (M.P.S.)
 Master of Arts in Law and Diplomacy (M.A.L.D.)
 Master of Arts in International Policy Studies (M.A.I.P.S.)
 Master of Public Management (M.P.M.)
 Master of Nonprofit Organizations (M.N.O. or M.N.P.O.) or Master of Nonprofit Management (M.N.M)
 Master of Governmental Administration (M.G.A.)
 Master of Urban Planning (M.U.P.)
 Master of City Planning (M.C.P.)
 Master of Regional Planning (M.R.P.)
 Master of Urban and Regional Planning (M.U.R.P.)
 Master of International Affairs (M.I.A.)
 Master of Global Policy Studies (M.G.P.S.)
 Master of Arts, Master of Science, Graduate Certificates or concentrations within the aforementioned master's and doctoral degrees 
 Political Science
 International Affairs 
 Urban Studies
 International Security 
 National Security
 Security Studies 
 Homeland Security and Emergency Managment  
 Public Service

Bachelor's Degrees 
Bachelor of Arts or Bachelor of Science - Academic majors 

 Political Science and Government 
 Public Administration 
 International Affairs 
 Urban Studies
 Security Studies

Academic concentrations and Academic minors

 Homeland Security
 Urban Studies
 Intelligence Studies and Intelligence Analysis 
 Public Policy and Administration / Public Policy and Managment 
 Political Communication
 Economic Analysis for Public Policy and Administration
 Political Analysis 
 International Political Economy
 Political Philosophy 
 Political Communication 

Academic degrees
Public policy